Kanggape a.k.a. Igom is a Ramu language of Papua New Guinea. Together with Andarum, there were  speakers in 1981.

References

Ataitan languages
Languages of Madang Province